Welsh devolution (Welsh: Datganoli i Gymru) is the transfer of legislative power for self-governance to Wales by the Government of the United Kingdom.

Wales was conquered by England during the 13th century, with the Laws in Wales Acts 1535 and 1542 applying English law to Wales and incorporating it into England, and later Great Britain and the United Kingdom.

Political movements supporting Welsh self-rule began in the late nineteenth century alongside a rise in Welsh nationalism. The devolution of some administrative responsibilities began in the early twentieth century, as well as the passing of laws specific to Wales. Since World War II, various movements and proposals have advocated different models of Welsh devolution. In 1979, a referendum on devolution was rejected by 79% of voters amid regional divisions and cultural concerns, but by 1997 support for devolution had increased and was narrowly supported in a referendum. Laws were subsequently passed to establish the National Assembly for Wales and grant it secondary legislative powers over areas such as agriculture, education and housing. The third referendum in 2011 saw voters support full primary law-making powers for the National Assembly over specified areas of governance. After the Senedd and Elections (Wales) Act 2020, the National Assembly was renamed "Senedd Cymru" (in Welsh) and the "Welsh Parliament" (in English) (also collectively referred to as the "Senedd"), which was seen as a better reflection of the body's expanded legislative powers.

The Welsh Labour Party advocates for further Welsh devolution and "far-reaching federalism" with powers equal Scotland and Northern Ireland, whilst the Welsh nationalist party, Plaid Cymru has described devolution as a stepping stone towards full Welsh independence.

History

Background 
Wales was conquered by England during the 13th century and the last native prince of Wales, Llywelyn the Last was killed in an ambush by an English soldier in 1282. According to Brenhinoedd y Saeson manuscript, the death traumatised the nation and Wales was now an English colony. The 1284 Statute of Rhuddlan caused Wales to lose its de facto independence and formed the constitutional basis for it as a principality in the "Realm of England". Owain Glyndwr briefly restored Welsh independence in a national uprising that began in 1400 after he was declared Prince of Wales. He convened Wales' first Senedd in Machynlleth in 1404, but the Welsh were eventually defeated by the English by 1412.

The Laws in Wales Acts 1535 and 1542 passed by the English Parliament applied English law to Wales and united the Principality and the Marches of Wales. This effectively ended both regions and incorporated Wales into England. The Wales and Berwick Act 1746 then defined "England" to include Wales until almost 200 years later when the Welsh Language Act 1967, separated Wales from England within the sovereign state of the United Kingdom.

Home rule movement

Independence of church 
The Sunday Closing (Wales) Act 1881 was the first legislation to acknowledge that Wales had a separate politico-legal character from the rest of the English state. at the time, a majority of people in Wales belonged to noncomformists chapels despite members of the Church of England having legal and social privileges. The Sunday Closing Act was therefore celebrated in Wales as a significant step towards establishing equal status for the noncomformist chapels and disestablishing the Anglican church in Wales. Historian and former BBC Wales producer John Trefor suggests that the act "was a victory, not only for the chapels and the temperance leagues, but for Welsh identity. He goes on to say, "There was a sense that things could be done differently here. Wales-only Education and cemetery acts came soon after, and in many respects it established the principle on which devolution and the National Assembly are based."

David Lloyd George, MP for Caernarfon at the time, was devoted to Welsh devolution early in his career, starting with the Church in Wales. He said in 1890; "I am deeply impressed with the fact that Wales has wants and inspirations of her own which have too long been ignored, but which must no longer be neglected. First and foremost amongst these stands the cause of religious liberty and equality in Wales. If returned to Parliament by you, it shall be my earnest endeavour to labour for the triumph of this great cause. I believe in a liberal extension of the principle of decentralisation." In 1895, in a Church in Wales Bill which was ultimately unsuccessful, Lloyd George added an amendment in a discreet attempt at forming a sort of Welsh home rule, a national council for appointment of the Welsh Church commissioners. The Welsh Church Act 1914 was passed giving the Church in Wales the freedom to govern its own affairs. After being suspended for the duration of the First World War, the Act came into effect from 1920.

Home rule 
In response to the Irish demand for "home rule", Liberal prime minister of the UK, William Gladstone proposed two bills on home rule for Ireland in 1886 and 1893, which both failed. Although the idea of "home rule all round" had been around since the 1830s the idea became more popular in 1910 during the constitutional conference and on the brink of an Irish war during 1913–14.

In the same year as the first bill for Ireland was proposed, the Cymru Fydd (Wales To Be/Wales Will Be) movement was founded to further the home rule cause for Wales. Lloyd George was one of the main leaders of Cymru Fydd which was an organisation created with the aim of establishing a Welsh Government and a "stronger Welsh identity". As such Lloyd George was seen as a radical figure in British politics and was associated with the reawakening of Welsh nationalism and identity, saying in 1880, "Is it not high time that Wales should the powers to manage its own affairs".  Historian Emyr Price has referred to him as "the first architect of Welsh devolution and its most famous advocate’" as well as "the pioneering advocate of a powerful parliament for the Welsh people". The first Cymru Fydd societies were set up in Liverpool and London in 1887 and in the winter the winter of 1886–7, the North and South Wales liberal federations were founded. Lloyd George was also particularly active in attempting to set up a separate Welsh National Party which was based on Charles Stewart Parnell's Irish Parliamentary Party and also worked to unite the North and South Wales Liberal Federations with Cymru Fydd to form a Welsh National Liberal Federation. The Cymru Fydd movement collapsed in 1896 amid personal rivalries and rifts between Liberal representatives such as David Alfred Thomas. In 1898 however, David Lloyd George managed to form the Welsh National Liberal Council, a loose umbrella organisation covering the two federations.

Support for home rule for Wales and Scotland amongst most political parties was strongest in 1918 following the independence of other European countries after the First World War, and the Easter Rising in Ireland, wrote Dr Davies. Although Cymru Fydd had collapsed, home rule was still on the agenda, with liberal Joseph Chamberlain proposing "Home Rule All Round" for all nations of the United Kingdom, in part to meet Irish demands but maintain the superiority of the imperial parliament of Westminster. This idea which eventually fell out of favour after "southern Ireland" left the UK and became a dominion in 1921 and the Irish free state was established in 1922. Home rule all round became official labour party policy, by he 1920s, but the Liberals lost interest because if a Welsh Parliament was formed they would not control it.

Welsh institutions form

The late 19th saw the formation of a number of national institutions; a national and annual cultural event, the National Eisteddfod of Wales in 1861, the Football Association of Wales in 1876, the Welsh Rugby Union in 1881 and the University of Wales in 1893.

In 1896, Education in Wales began to become distinct with the formation of the Central Welsh Board which inspected grammar schools in Wales and The Welsh Intermediate Education Act 1889 was brought about to "make further provision for the intermediate and technical education of the inhabitants of Wales and the county of Monmouth.", making the board responsible for inspection of secondary schools. In 1907, the Welsh department of the Board of Education was formed and in the same year, a Welsh Inspectorate was established for inspection of primary and secondary schools in Wales.

The early 20th century also saw the continued formation of a number of Welsh national institutions; the National Library of Wales in 1911, the Welsh Guards in 1915 and the Welsh Board of Health in 1919. The Church of Wales was established in 1920 following the disestablishment of the Church of England via the Welsh Church Act 1914.

There had been discussions about the need for a "Welsh party" since the 19th century. With the generation or so before 1922 there "had been a marked growth in the constitutional recognition of the Welsh nation", wrote historian Dr John Davies. By 1924 there were people in Wales "eager to make their nationality the focus of Welsh politics". In 1925 Plaid Genedlaethol Cymru ("the National Party of Wales") was founded; it was renamed Plaid Cymru – The Party of Wales in 1945. The party's principles defined in 1970 were (1) self government for Wales, (2) to safeguard the culture, traditions, language and economic position of Wales and (3) to secure membership for a self-governing Welsh state in the United Nations.

Early members of the Independent Labour Party attempted to establish a South Wales Federation towards the end of the 19th century but the South Wales Regional Council of Labour was not established until 1937. The UK Labour government elected in 1945 was strongly centrist, but in the same year, there were 15 UK Government departments established in Wales. By 1947, a unified Welsh Regional Council of Labour became responsible for all Wales. In 1959 the Labour council title was changed from "Welsh Regional council" to "Welsh council", and the Labour body was renamed Labour Party Wales in 1975.

Council for Wales 

Welsh Labour backbenchers such as D. R. Grenfell, W. H. Mainwaring and James Griffiths supported the establishment of a Secretary of State post whereas Aneurin Bevan thought devolution would distract from "British mainstream politics". The UK Government compromised and agreed to the establishment of a Council for Wales and Monmouthshire. However, it was given no more than a responsibility to advise the UK government on matters of Welsh interest.

The proposal to set up a Council for Wales and Monmouthshire was announced in the House of Commons on 24 November 1948.  Its inaugural meeting was in May 1949, and its first business meeting the following month. Its terms of reference were:

 to meet from time to time and at least quarterly for the interchange of views and information on development and trends in the economic and cultural fields in Wales and Monmouthshire; and
 to ensure the government is adequately informed of the impact of government activities on the general life of the people of Wales and Monmouthshire.

The Council for Wales and Monmouthshire had 27 appointed members.  Of these, 12 were nominated by Welsh local authorities; there were also nominees from the Joint Education Committee, the University of Wales, the National Eisteddfod Council, the Welsh Tourist and Holidays Board, and from both management and union sides of Welsh industry and agriculture. The chairman was Huw T. Edwards, a trade union leader.  The Council met in private, a further source of controversy. It set up various panels and committees to investigate issues affecting Wales, including a Welsh Language Panel to study and report upon the present situation of the language; a Government Administration Panel; an Industrial Panel; a Rural Development Panel; a Transport Panel; and a Tourist Industry Panel.

Parliament for Wales campaign 

In the 1950s, the deterioration of the British Empire removed a sense of Britishness and there was a realisation that Wales was not as prosperous as south-east England and smaller European countries. Successive Conservative Party victories in Westminster led to suggestions that only through self-government could Wales achieve a government reflecting the votes of a Welsh electorate. The Tryweryn flooding which was voted against by every single Welsh MP, suggested that Wales as a nation was powerless. The Epynt clearance in 1940 has also been described as a "significant - but often overlooked - chapter in the history of Wales".

Those in favour of a Welsh parliament paraded in Machynlleth (the place of Owain Glyndŵr's last Senedd) on 1 October 1949. Speakers and entertainment were also at the event. From 1950 to 1956, Parliament for Wales campaign brought devolution back onto the political agenda. A cross-party campaign was led by Lady Megan Lloyd George, daughter of former Prime minister and campaigner for Welsh devolution, David Lloyd George who had passed away in 1945. The Campaign for a Welsh parliament (Ymgyrch Senedd i Gymru) was formally launched on 1 July 1950, at a rally in Llandrindod. This event lead to the creation of a petition of 240,652 names calling for the establishment of a Welsh parliament, which was presented to the House of Commons by Megan Lloyd George in 1956. This was rejected by the UK government. Petitions were also presented to the House of Commons for a Secretary of State for Wales which were also rejected.

Welsh Office & Secretary of State for Wales 

In the first half of the 20th century, a number of politicians had supported the creation of the post of Secretary of State for Wales as a step towards home rule for Wales. A post of Minister of Welsh Affairs was created in 1951 under the home secretary and was promoted to minister of state level in 1954. In 1964, the UK Labour government formed a new office of the Secretary of State for Wales and in 1965 the Welsh Office was created which was run by the Secretary of State for Wales and which was responsible for implementing UK government policies in Wales. In 1999 the Welsh Office made way for the National Assembly for Wales and staff from the Welsh office moved into the National Assembly.

Official flag and capital city 

The first official flag of Wales was created in 1953 for the coronation of Queen Elizabeth II. This "augmented" flag including the Royal badge of Wales was criticised in 1958 by "Gorsedd y Beirdd", a national Welsh group comprising Welsh literary figures and Welsh people of note. In 1959, likely in response to criticism, the Welsh flag was changed to a red Welsh dragon on a green and white background that remains the current flag of Wales today.

On 21 December 1955, the Lord Mayor of Cardiff announced to a crowd that Cardiff was now the official capital of Wales following a parliamentary vote the previous day by Welsh local authority members. Cardiff won the vote with 136 votes and Caernarfon came in second place with 11 votes. A campaign for Cardiff to become the capital city had been ongoing for 30 years prior to the vote. Historian James Cowan outlined some reasons why Cardiff was chosen which included; being the largest city in Wales with a population of 243,632, buildings in Cathays park such as City Hall and the National Museum of Wales among other reasons. Dr Martin Johnes, lecturer at Swansea University suggested that following the formation of the National Assembly for Wales in 1999, Cardiff became "a capital in a meaningful way, as the home of the Welsh government, whereas before, its capital status was irrelevant, it was just symbolic".

First Plaid Cymru MP 

The leader of Plaid Cymru, Gwynfor Evans won the party's first-ever seat in Westminster in Carmarthen in 1966, which "helped change the course of a nation" according to Dr Martin Johnes of Swansea University. This, paired with the SNP's Winnie Ewing's winning a seat in Hamilton, Scotland in 1967 may have contributed to pressure on Labour prime minister Harold Wilson to form the Kilbrandon Commission. This event may have also contributed to the passing of the Welsh Language Act 1967. This act repealed a provision in the Wales and Berwick Act 1746 that the term "England" should include Wales, thus defining Wales to be a separate entity from England within the UK. The legislation permitted the use of Welsh including in courts of law. The act was in part based upon the Hughes Parry Report from 1965. While the Welsh Courts Act in 1942 had previously allowed limited use of Welsh if defendants or plaintiffs had limited knowledge of English, the 1967 act was far more robust. While the act itself was quite limited, it had large symbolic importance. In 1966, Emlyn Hooson convinced a majority of delegates to merge both the Welsh liberal federations into a single entity, forming the Welsh Liberal Party. The new party had far more authority, and gradually centralised the finances and policy of the party in Wales.

National Assembly referendums 

The UK Labour government introduced separate devolution bills for Wales, Scotland and Northern Ireland in 1977 following the support for a Scottish parliament by the Kilbrandon Commission. On St David's Day (March 1), 1979 Welsh devolution referendum was held on a National Assembly for Wales but came at the end of the Winter of Discontent in addition to "tribalism" divisions within Wales. According to John Morris, people in southern Wales were persuaded that the Assembly would be dominated by "bigoted Welsh-speakers from the north and the west" whilst in the northern Wales, people were persuaded that the Assembly would be dominated by Glamorgan County Council “Taffia”. Richard Wyn Jones also suggests that suspicions of a secret elite of a "Taffia" or "crachach" may have affected the referendum results,“There was a perception amongst anti-devolutionists that devolution was some sort of plot by the establishment, by the crachach. Their [the anti-devolutionists’] idea that they were standing up for ‘the people’ was reinforced by 1979.”  Welsh voters voted against forming an Assembly, with 79.7% voting against and 20.3% who voting Yes. Meanwhile, Scotland had narrowly voted in favour of a Scottish parliament with 51.6% in favour.

The Welsh Language Act 1993 provided a new law for public organisations in Wales to have bilingual schemes, which would be supervised by the Welsh Language Board. Some private sector companies including British Telecoms (BT) and British Gas had already included Welsh language schemes in company policies before this Act.

In the 1980s, economic restructuring and market reforms by Margaret Thatcher are described as having brought social dislocation to parts of Wales, which was formerly described as having "the largest public sector west of the Iron Curtain". A succession of non-Welsh Conservative Secretaries of State after 1987 was portrayed by opponents as 'colonial' and indicative of a 'democratic deficit'.

In the early 1990s, Labour became committed to devolution to both Scotland and Wales, and in 1997 it was elected with a mandate to hold referendums on a Scottish Parliament and a Welsh Assembly. The political climate was very different from that of 1979 Welsh devolution referendum which resulted in a no vote, with a new generation of Welsh MPs in Westminster and a broad consensus on the previously divisive issue of the Welsh language. In the 1997 Welsh devolution referendum, a majority of the Welsh electorate vote in favour of establishing a National Assembly for Wales by 50.3 per cent, on a 50.2 per cent turnout.

Devolved legislature (1998–present) 

The Government of Wales Act 1998 granted the formation of the National Assembly and granted it a significant number of new powers which included most of the powers previously held by the Secretary of State for Wales and at least 20 national institutions including the Education and Learning Wales, Environment Agency Wales and the Welsh Language Board. The National Assembly for Wales was formed in 1999 and the UK Parliament reserved the right to set limits on its powers.

Law making 
The Commission on the Powers and Electoral Arrangements of the National Assembly for Wales (the Richard Commission) was formed in 2002. This commission made a series of recommendations in 2004. These included an increased number of members, legally separating executive and legislative acts and the devolution of primary law-making powers. A large majority of these findings were used by the UK government to introduce the Government of Wales Act 2006, describing the powers and responsibilities of the devolved authorities for legislating, decision-making and policy-making. In March 2011, a referendum was held on whether full primary law-making powers should be given to the National Assembly in the twenty subject areas where it held jurisdiction. The referendum concluded with 63.5% of voters supporting the transfer of full primary law-making powers to the Assembly.

Official country and language status 
In 2011, the International Standards Organisation officially changed the status of Wales to country after the term "principality" was used in error. This came about following lobbying from Plaid Cymru AM (Assembly Member) Leanne Wood. Legally Wales had ceased to be a principality since the period that the Statue of Rhuddlan was implemented from 1284 to 1542. The governments of the United Kingdom and of Wales almost invariably define Wales as a country. VisitWales.com states that "Wales is not a Principality. Although we are joined with England by land, and we are part of Great Britain, Wales is a country in its own right."

The Welsh Language (Wales) Measure 2011 modernised the 1993 Welsh Language Act and gave Welsh an official status in Wales for the first time, a major landmark for the language. Welsh is the only official de jure language of any country in the UK. The Measure was also responsible for creating the post of Welsh Language Commissioner, replacing the Welsh Language Board. Following the referendum in 2011, the Official Languages Act became the first Welsh law to be created in 600 years, according to the First Minister at the time, Carwyn Jones. This law was passed by Welsh AMs (assembly members) only and made Welsh an official language of the National Assembly.

Further powers 
The UK Government also formed the Commission on Devolution in Wales (the Silk Commission). The commission published part 1 of its report in 2012, recommending new financial powers for Wales including borrowing and taxation, which came into force in the Wales Act 2014. The Tax Collection and Management (Wales) Act 2016 was passed by the National Assembly to facilitate the financial powers of the Wales Act 2014. The Land Transaction Tax (replacing Stamp Duty) and the Landfill Disposal Tax were the very first two devolved taxes. In 2019, over £2 billion of income tax was devolved to the Senedd.
The Wales Act 2017 defined the National Assembly and devolved institutions to be a permanent component of the UK constitution, and any abolition of such institutions would require a referendum. The act also changed the model of operation of the devolved institutions from a "conferred powers model" to a "reserved powers model". This allowed the Assembly to legislate on any matter that is not expressly reserved from its competence. The Assembly was also given the power to decide its own name and voting system of members. In May 2020, the Senedd and Elections (Wales) Act 2020, the National Assembly for Wales was renamed "Senedd Cymru" or "the Welsh Parliament", commonly known as the "Senedd" in both English and Welsh, to reflect increased legislative powers. The Act for the first time in Wales allowed 16 and 17-year-olds the right to vote, beginning with the 2021 Senedd election.

Plaid Cymru proposed two bills to the UK parliament in the 2021-22 parliamentary session which ultimately did not gain royal assent. A Crown Estate (Devolution to Wales) Bill - A bill to devolve the Crown Estate's management and assets in Wales to the Welsh Government was sponsored by Liz Saville Roberts. Shared Prosperity Fund (Wales) Bill - A bill which would require the Secretary of State to report to Parliament on the merits of devolving management and administration of the money allocated to Wales via the Shared Prosperity Fund to the Welsh Government, was sponsored by Ben Lake.

Bills under current consideration 
 Bank Holidays (Wales) Bill [HL] - A bill to devolve powers to set bank holidays, sponsored by Christine Humphreys, also similarly proposed by Mark Williams, also of the Liberal Democrats during the 2015-16 session.
 Government of Wales (Devolved Powers) Bill [HL] - A bill that prohibits powers of the Senedd from being amended or withdrawn without a super-majority vote of Senedd members, sponsored by Dafydd Wigley of Plaid Cymru.

Currently devolved powers 

The powers currently employed by the Senedd are, in summary:
 Agriculture, forestry and fishing
 Education
 Environment
 Health and social care
 Housing
 Local government
 Highways and transport
 Some control over income tax, stamp duty and landfill tax
 Welsh language

Constitutional options 

Since 1997, there has been evidence of increased support for, and trust in, the Senedd and greater support for it to receive enhanced powers, including the 2011 referendum for  legislative powers. The Independent Commission on the Constitutional Future of Wales is an ongoing commission established by the Welsh Government that will make recommendations about Wales’ constitutional future and the powers of the Senedd. Having their first meeting on the 25th of November 2021, Professor Laura McAllister and Dr Rowan Williams are co-chairing the commission with McAllister stating that all options are on the table, including independence. The commission has two main objectives which are consideration and development of options for reform of constitutional structures of the UK, and progressive principal options to strengthen Welsh democracy and deliver improvements for Wales. The interim findings of the commission outlined three viable options for Wales, to be explored in more depth in 2023:
 Entrenched devolution
 Federal structures
 Independence

Entrenched devolution 
This is the first of the three constitutional options for Wales as proposed by the Independent Commission on the Constitutional Future of Wales. This option includes:

 Protection against unilateral changes by the UK Parliament and Government
 More constructive intergovernmental relations
 More stable foundation for Welsh governance in the future
 Potential expansion of devolved powers, including justice and policing.

This option has been described as providing greater stability and requiring minimal changes for other countries of the UK.

On 5 December 2022, The UK Labour party announced that if elected, they would reform the house of lords to form a Council of the Nations and Regions. They would also devolve to the Senedd; Jobcentre plus, youth justice & probation service and access to British Regional Investment Bank. This plan have been described as almost being like a federal state.

Adam Price asked Mark Drakeford why devolution of justice was not in the Labour constitutional future report, saying “The Brown commission recommendation to devolve just youth justice and probation takes us back 10 years in the devolution debate in Wales". Mark Drakeford responded by saying he hoped the devolution of youth justice and probation was the "start of that process", "Of course, we want that process to go further".

Federalism 

The Independent Commission on the Constitutional Future of Wales proposes the following reform for this option:

 The UK Parliament and Government's responsibility for the UK is separate to England
 Reform of the House of Lords
 Devolved financial responsibility for taxation
 Optional devolved financial responsibility for welfare

Historically, David Lloyd George felt that disestablishment, land reform and other forms of Welsh devolution could only be achieved if Wales formed its own government within a federal imperial system. The Welsh Labour Party supports "far-reaching federalism" with powers equal Scotland and Northern Ireland. The powers suggested in their proposals include (amongst other suggestions):

 The UK becomes a voluntary union of 4 nations
 Devolution is permanent and cannot be undone without agreement from electorate
 Equalised devolution across nations to match e.g. Scotland
 House of Lords reformed to reflect the make-up of the United Kingdom & protects the constitution and devolution
 Each government determines and is held accountable for tax and spending priorities
 Justice and policing devolved to Wales (as it is in Scotland and Northern Ireland)

Independence 

With independence, Wales would become a sovereign country, and would be able to apply for full membership of the United Nations and other international organisations. As an independent country, Wales would be free to choose from a  variety of governance options which could include agreements with other parts of the UK, such as in a free association or a confederation.

Confederation 
A UK confederation would mean that each constituent country of the UK becomes sovereign and agrees to a treaty and central senate/council. This central senate or council would decide on a small number of central policies such as internal trade, currency, defence and foreign relations, with everything else being governed by the governments of the constituent countries. Former first minister of Wales, Carwyn Jones is reportedly a supporter of a confederal system and has been working with Gordon Brown on his recommendations for a constitutional reform of the UK. There does not seem to be any evidence thus far to suggest that Brown's recommendations include a confederal-type model.

Proposed areas of devolution

Taxation and welfare 

A 2020 YouGov poll found that 59% of Welsh voters would be in favour of devolution of tax and welfare, known as "devo-max". The question asked was “If there was a referendum tomorrow on the transferring of more powers to the Senedd (Welsh Parliament), including control of tax and welfare, but excluding defence and foreign affairs, how would you vote? Should more powers be transferred to the Senedd (Welsh Parliament)?”.

The Welsh government have also called for a vacant land tax to "incentivise developers to progress stalled developments to help provide high quality, safe and affordable housing." Sioned Williams, Plaid Cymru MS (member of Senedd) has called for devolution of welfare powers to the Senedd in response to cuts to Universal Credit made by the UK government. Williams also suggested that full taxation powers should be devolved to the Senedd because "any reforms to tackle poverty that we undertake in Wales will always be limited" without full taxation powers. A study by the Wales Governance Centre at Cardiff University concluded that devolvement of welfare benefits to Wales could increase the Welsh budget by £200 million per annum. The cross-party equality committee of the Senedd also concluded in 2019 that devolution of said powers may create a more "compassionate" system.

On the other hand, first minister Mark Drakeford claims that Universal Credit is "better discharged" at a UK wide level and "part of the glue that holds the United Kingdom together" even after suggesting that the cuts to the welfare system by the UK government were "cruel and deliberate".

On 8 February 2023, Plaid Cymru called for the Welsh Government to support the devolution of setting all rates and bands for Welsh Income Tax. Plaid leader Adam Price said that lack of tax powers hampers effective policy-making in Wales, particularly in responding to the cost-of-living crisis and public services crises. This proposed devolution would match powers already devolved to the Scottish Parliament via the Scotland Act 2012. A report published earlier in the same week by the Senedd’s Finance Committee recommended that the Welsh Government researches the risks and benefits of devolving powers to change  income tax band rates and thresholds.

Rail infrastructure 
Rail infrastructure funding is the responsibility of Network Rail and the UK Government but there are calls from the Welsh Government and cross-party agreement in the Senedd for the devolution of rail infrastructure to Wales, according to Ken Skates AM, Minister for Economy and Transport in a proposal for devolution document. The Wales Governance Centre at Cardiff University has concluded that Wales could have had an additional £514 million for investment from 2011 to 2012 and 2019-20 if rail infrastructure was devolved during this period.

HS2's classification as an England and Wales project, whilst being entirely in England has also been used as a reason for rail infrastructure devolution, with Westminster Welsh Affairs committee finding that HS2 will not benefit Wales and needs better north–south links. This classification means that Wales "loses out" on £5bn of rail spending. Mark Drakeford has suggested that rail infrastructure should be devolved, saying "the union connectivity review that the UK Government established concluded that devolution had been good for transport" and added that "successive Welsh Governments have made for the devolution of responsibility in rail to the Senedd, accompanied though, as Ken Skates has said, by the funding that needs to go alongside that responsibility.” 

In March 2023, a second rail project, Northern Powerhouse Rail was classified as an England and Wales project, meaning Wales would not receive a £1bn Barnett consequential. Plaid Cymru MP Liz Saville Roberts again called for the full devolution of rail infrastructure.

Justice system 

The Labour Welsh Government, Plaid Cymru and various authors have called for the criminal justice system to move from and England and Wales system to a devolved Welsh system for Wales.

The Commission on Justice in Wales produced a report in 2019 assessing the justice system in Wales for the first time in over 200 years. The report criticised the UK government's funding of justice in Wales, noting that the cuts to the justice budget by the UK government was "amongst the most severe of all departmental budget cuts". The report notes how the Welsh Government has used its own money to attempt to "mitigate the damaging effects of these policies". 40% of justice funding is contributed in Wales in addition to Welsh taxpayers money paid to Westminster which is redistributed back to Wales. The report determined that "justice should be determined and delivered in Wales".  In summary, the report made the following recommendations: Justice responsibilities should be held by a single Welsh MS and department, form a Welsh Criminal Justice Board, Criminal justice data should be Wales specific and more detailed and increased utilisation of prison alternatives, particularly for women.

There been calls for justice be devolved to the Senedd by the Welsh Government, and a report in 2022 proposed:
 A focus on prevention and rehabilitation.
 Reducing the prison population by pursuing alternatives to custody where appropriate. These include programmes to tackle mental health issues and support and treatment for drug and alcohol misuse.
 Using a rights based approach to law and policy making, and further incorporation of internationally agreed rights into domestic law.
In December 2022 first minister Mark Drakeford reiterated his desire for devolution of justice and said about Gordon Brown's Labour manifesto proposals of devolution of probation and youth justice, "in a practical way, we should focus on those aspects first, and if we can secure their devolution to Wales, then we will be able to move on from there into the other aspects that would follow."

Broadcasting 

A cross-party Senedd inquiry via a report by The Culture, Welsh Language and Communications Committee concludes that the Senedd should have increased control over how broadcasting is both regulated and funded. The chair of this committee, MS Bethan Sayed concluded that Wales does not have "the media it needs to function as a successful nation". This report included the following recommendations: Increased broadcasting powers devolved, Ofcom with the Welsh and UK governments should state how media can be improved, an impartial fund formed by the Welsh government for news, establishment of an independent funding commission including a Welsh representative (with consent from other UK nations), all Welsh-language broadcasting devolved, Welsh government control of the Channel 3 licence  (ITV) in Wales with increased Welsh content and improved BBC feedback forum for improvement of BBC policies.

In June 2022, the members of a new expert panel were announced for the devolution of communications and broadcasting powers to Wales as part of the co-operation agreement between the Welsh Government and Plaid Cymru.

It was revealed in November 2022 that former first minister of Wales, Carwyn Jones was offered the devolution of S4C by the Secretary of State for Culture, Media and Sport at the time, Jeremy Hunt. Jones said that he could not agree to devolution of the channel because it was offered “without a budget and without a penny". The chair of Cymdeithas yr Iaith ("The Language Society") said that Jones should have accepted the offer and explored other means of funding, adding, “It’s been obvious for years that the Westminster Government is not interested in S4C. In 2010 it cut S4C’s funding significantly and the channel’s funding now comes through the BBC; S4C also has to share a number of resources with the BBC. So it’s not much surprise Westminster wants to wash their hands of the channel."

Natural resources & Crown Estate 

The first minister, Mark Drakeford suggested that devolving the Crown Estates in Wales to the Welsh government could enable the government to harness the renewable energy potential in Wales saying, “Geography is on our side. If you're on the west side of the UK, you have the prevailing winds. We are surrounded on three sides by water.” Liz Saville Roberts MP, leader of Plaid Cymru in Westminster, suggested that devolving these estates could “bring half a billion pounds worth of offshore wind and tidal stream potential under Welsh control." On 21 June 2021, Roberts presented the "Crown Estate (Devolution to Wales) Bill" to the UK Parliament saying this would “devolve management of the Crown Estate and its assets in Wales to the Welsh Government”. Boris Johnson said that this would "fragment the market, complicate existing processes and make it more difficult for Wales and the rest of the UK to move forward to net-zero”. A petition to transfer powers over the £500m Crown Estate to the Senedd gathered over 10,000 signatures by February 2022. The "Climate Change, Environment and Infrastructure Committee" of the Senedd published a report on 22 February 2022 recommending the devolution of the Crown Estate and using its income to combat climate change. In August 2022, over 5,000 people signed a petition calling for control of Welsh natural resources including water, electricity and the crown estate in Wales to be devolved to the Senedd.

Mark Drakeford confirmed in January 2023 that devolving the Crown Estate was Welsh government policy.

Shared Prosperity Fund 
The Shared Prosperity Fund is a UK government fund that replaced the European Structural Funds following Brexit from the EU. European Structural Funding to Wales averaged £375m during EU membership with decision making by the Welsh government. Labour leader, Keir Starmer has promised to devolve the EU replacement fund to the Welsh government, if Labour is elected in the next UK general election. Plaid Cymru have also introduced a Bill for the devolution of the Shared Prosperity Fund.

Bank holidays 
There are proposals for the powers concerning bank holidays to be devolved to Wales. St David's Day (1 March) is Wales' patron saint day and, like England's St George's Day, is not currently a bank holiday. Powers over bank holidays are devolved in Scotland, with their patron saint day, St Andrew's Day, being a bank holiday, with Northern Ireland also having a bank holiday for St Patrick's Day. In 2022, over 10,000 people signed an online e-petition to the UK Parliament for St David's Day to be a bank holiday.

Energy firm taxation and regulation 
In 2022, Adam Price, leader of Plaid Cymru, suggested that the power to tax and regulate energy firms should be devolved to Wales in the wake of the energy price crisis in the UK and a 54% rise in energy price cap. Mark Drakeford, although agreeing with the sentiment that the price cap should be lowered, believed that it was a matter of getting a UK government to "do the right thing".

Equality Act: gender identity 
Plaid Cymru have called for devolution of the equality act in their manifesto in order to the Senedd to ensure better provisions for equality and representation. In February 2022, an action plan confirmed that the Welsh labour government would  “seek the devolution of powers in relation to Gender Recognition and support our trans community” and suggested that the powers could be devolved “in the short term”. A UK government equality hub spokesperson has said, "there are no plans to reform the Gender Recognition Act in England or Wales".

Regional devolution

In February 2023, following the Welsh Government scrapping various planned road infrastructure projects in North Wales, including a potential Third Menai Crossing, Ken Skates MS and former Welsh transport minister, argued that the Welsh Government should devolve powers over road infrastructure, as well as rail and road funding, and public transport planning to North Wales. The projects were scrapped to allow Wales to meet carbon emission targets.

Restrictions by UK government 
The UK Parliament passed the UK Internal Market Act in 2020 which "directly constrains devolution" according to the Scottish Government. The actions of the Act are described in a report by Scottish MSP, Michael Russell, Cabinet Secretary for Constitution, Europe and External Affairs; The act allows goods sold in one part of the UK to be automatically accepted in the rest of the UK, despite differing devolved rules. The act can also cause the regulation of service in one part of the UK to be recognised across the whole UK. The act allows UK ministers to spend on devolved policies without the approval of the devolved parliament.

The Welsh Government has voiced concerns over the United Kingdom Internal Market Act 2020, passed by the UK Parliament, describing its passing as an "attack on its competence".  It launched a request for judicial review of the act, which was rejected on the ground of being premature by the divisional court.  As of February 2022, the Welsh government awaited an appeal of the divisional court's decision.

Assessment of devolution 
Ron Davies, former secretary of state for Wales and described as the architect of devolution said in 2022, "One thing which I know is lacking is an overarching sense of wanting to create a better way, of wanting to shape our own destiny. I don't see that." His deputy, Peter Hain said "We need to do what we all say we want to do, which is create a more vibrant, competitive, successful Wales economically. But it does mean some pretty tough decisions." Former leader of Plaid Cymru, Dafydd Wigley stated "We have yet to see the election in Wales, changing the colour of a government. And democracy in Wales will not have been properly tested until that happens." Originally the leader of the No campaign in the 90s, Conservative Nick Bourne now supports more members for the Senedd "We need more members. It's got expanded powers, it's the settled will of the people that we have a Welsh parliament, and that's got to be effective, so by all means, be concerned about value for money, we should be, as any political party should be, but in terms of is it a good idea then the personal view is we need more members."

Political party position on devolution
The following parties support Welsh independence:
Plaid Cymru (including further devolution) 
Green Party of England and Wales 
Wales Green Party (including further devolution) 
Gwlad
The following parties support national sovereignty for Wales:
Propel
The following parties support further devolution, as well as reform/federalism of the United Kingdom:
Labour Party 
Welsh Labour
Liberal Democrats 
Welsh Liberal Democrats
The following parties support the current devolution system as it stands:
Conservative Party 
Welsh Conservatives
The following parties support reduced or the abolishment of devolution:
UK Independence Party
Abolish the Welsh Assembly Party

Referendum results and opinion polling

Polls on devolution status 
Note: On 4 March 2011, 63.5% voted to devolve primary lawmaking powers for the areas already devolved to the Senedd.

See also 

 List of movements in Wales
 Welsh independence
 Devolution in the United Kingdom
 Unionism in Wales
 Scottish devolution
 Senedd
 1979 Welsh devolution referendum
 1997 Welsh devolution referendum
 2011 Welsh devolution referendum
 Welsh law
 Wales Act 1978

References 

Welsh devolution
Political history of Wales
Campaigns and movements in Wales
Devolution in the United Kingdom